Calcium titanate is an inorganic compound with the chemical formula CaTiO3. As a mineral, it is called perovskite, named after Russian mineralogist, L. A. Perovski (1792-1856).  It is a colourless, diamagnetic solid, although the mineral is often coloured owing to impurities.

Synthesis
CaTiO3 can be prepared by the combination of CaO and TiO2 at temperatures >1300 °C. Sol-gel processes has been used to make a more pure substance, as well as lowering the synthesis temperature.  These compounds synthesized are more compressible due to the powders from the sol-gel process as well and bring it closer to its calculated density (~4.04 g/ml).

Structure

Calcium titanate is obtained as orthorhombic crystals, more specifically perovskite structure.  In this motif, the Ti(IV) centers are octahedral and the Ca2+ centers occupy a cage of 12 oxygen centres.  Many useful materials adopt related structures, e.g. barium titanate or variations of the structure, e.g. yttrium barium copper oxide.

Applications
Calcium titanate has relatively little value except as one of the ores of titanium, together with several others.  It is reduced to give titanium metal or ferrotitanium alloys.

See also
Perovskite
Perovskite (structure)
Perovskite solar cell

External links
Crystal structure of CaTiO3

References

Calcium compounds
Titanates
Perovskites